"The Happy Whistler" is a song written and performed by Don Robertson.  It reached #6 on the U.S. pop chart and #8 on the UK Singles Chart in 1956.

The song was ranked #43 on Billboard magazine's Top 50 singles of 1956.

Other charting versions
Cyril Stapleton featuring Desmond Lane released a version of the song as a single which reached #22 on the UK Singles Chart in 1956.

Other versions
Eddie "Lockjaw" Davis Trio released a version of the song as a single in 1956, but it did not chart.
Boots Randolph released a version of the song on his 1960 album Boots Randolph's Yakety Sax.
Ernie Fields released a version of the song as a single in 1961, but it did not chart.
The Echoes released a version of the song as a single in 1963, but it did not chart.
Jimmie Haskell and His Orchestra released a version of the song as the B-side to their 1965 single "Boom".
Sandy Nelson released a version of the song on his 1970 album Groovy.
Reginald Dixon released a version of the song as part of a medley with the songs "Willie Can" and "The Poor People of Paris" on his 2009 compilation album Reginald Dixon at the Organ.

Popular culture
In the 1960s and 1970s, "The Happy Whistler" was the theme song for the Channel 2 children's TV show, "Doctor Max and Mombo" based out of Cedar Rapids, Iowa.

References

Children's television theme songs
1956 songs
1956 singles
1961 singles
1963 singles
Songs written by Don Robertson (songwriter)
Sandy Nelson songs
Capitol Records singles
King Records (United States) singles
Fontana Records singles